Silent Night is a 1995 German-Swiss drama film directed by Dani Levy. It was entered into the 46th Berlin International Film Festival where it won an Honourable Mention.

Cast
 Maria Schrader as Julia
 Jürgen Vogel as Frank
 Mark Schlichter as Christian
 Ingrid Caven as Sängerin
 Maurice Lamy as Page
 Adisat Semenitsch as Katja
 Jenni Lau as Girl with Trumpet
 Ubi Ferguson as Bellboy No. 2
 Gerd Wameling
 Katharina Thalbach
 Inga Busch
 Nina Franoszek as Fernsehansagerin

References

External links

1995 films
Swiss drama films
1990s German-language films
1990s Christmas drama films
Films directed by Dani Levy
Films set in Berlin
Films set in Paris
German Christmas drama films
1990s German films